Zoran Planinić (born September 12, 1982) is a Croatian former professional basketball player.

Early years
Planinić was born in Mostar, Bosnia and Herzegovina, in the former Yugoslavia. He started his basketball career at HKK Brotnjo Čitluk from Čitluk, Bosnia and Herzegovina and was noticed by KK Cibona where he continued his junior career.

Professional career
In the 1999–2000 season, he started his professional career on loan to Benston Zagreb.

He returned to Cibona Zagreb in 2000 and he was named the Croatian League MVP in 2001. He stayed with Cibona until 2003.

In three NBA seasons he averaged 4 points, 1.4 rebounds and 1.1 assists per game. Planinić's three NBA seasons were not notable, with his only distinguishing moment coming in the 2005–06 season, when he hit a spectacular full-court, 77-foot, 3rd-quarter-ending buzzer beater at a home win, on 9 November 2005, against the Utah Jazz.

Planinić's final NBA game was Game 2 of the 2006 Eastern Conference Semi-finals on 10 May 2006 against the Miami Heat. New Jersey would lose the game 89 - 111 with Planinić recording 1 assist and 1 steal. Miami then won the next 3 games and eliminated the Nets from the playoffs.

In the summer of 2006, Planinić and the Nets agreed to a buyout, in which he was sent back to Europe to spend the season with TAU Cerámica of the Spanish ACB League, a team that also featured talented NBA prospect Tiago Splitter. With TAU Cerámica, Planinić won the Spanish Supercup championship in both 2006 and 2007, and the Spanish League championship in 2008.

On 25 June 2008 Planinić signed a two-year contract with the Russian Superleague A club CSKA Moscow. On 17 June 2010 he decided to sign a 2+1 contract with the Russian PBL club BC Khimki.

On 27 July 2013 he signed a two-year contract with Anadolu Efes. In January 2014, he hit a long-range buzzer beater in the last second of the game to defeat Olimpia Milano by a score of 61–60. In his first season with the team, he averaged 8.4 points and 3.7 assists, over 23 EuroLeague games. In the summer of 2014, Dušan Ivković was appointed as Efes' head coach, and Planinić lost his place in the team. Despite that, he was still under contract for the 2014–15 season.

EuroLeague career statistics

|-
| style="text-align:left;"| 2000–01
| style="text-align:left;"| Cibona
| 5 || 1 || 16.8 || .294 || .000 || .000 || 1.4 || 1.2 || .2 || .2 || 2.0 || -1.4
|-
| style="text-align:left;"| 2001–02
| style="text-align:left;"| Cibona
| 8 || 7 || 24.8 || .508 || .500 || .683 || 2.3 || 2.4 || 1.1 || .4 || 12.1 || 11.0
|-
| style="text-align:left;"| 2002–03
| style="text-align:left;"| Cibona
| 18 || 9 || 22.2 || .430 || .235 || .593 || 2.8 || 2.8 || .8 || .1 || 7.8 || 7.2
|-
| style="text-align:left;"| 2006–07
| style="text-align:left;"| Baskonia
| 18 || 11 || 24.2 || .457 || .281 || .677 || 2.7 || 3.8 || 1.3 || .3 || 9.3 || 11.6
|-
| style="text-align:left;"| 2007–08
| style="text-align:left;"| Baskonia
| 25 || 23 || 24.7 || .515 || .375 || .662 || 2.8 || 3.1 || .9 || .2 || 10.6 || 12.1
|-
| style="text-align:left;"| 2008–09
| style="text-align:left;"| CSKA
| 19 || 4 || 18.7 || .447 || .341 || .680 || 1.8 || 2.1 || .5 || .3 || 7.0 || 7.2
|-
| style="text-align:left;"| 2009–10
| style="text-align:left;"| CSKA
| 21 || 17 || 21.4 || .455 || .295 || .649 || 2.9 || 2.1 || 1.1 || .1 || 7.5 || 8.1
|-
| style="text-align:left;"| 2010–11
| style="text-align:left;"| Khimki
| 10 || 6 || 29.0 || .488 || .290 || .710 || 4.2 || 3.1 || .9 || .2 || 11.1 || 13.2
|-
| style="text-align:left;"| 2012–13
| style="text-align:left;"| Khimki
| 22 || 22 || 30.8 || .447 || .164 || .667 || 3.9 || style="background:#CFECEC;"| 6.3 || 1.1 || .1 || 12.4 || 15.2
|-
| style="text-align:left;"| 2013–14
| style="text-align:left;"| Anadolu Efes
| 23 || 9 || 23.5 || .394 || .298 || .737 || 2.4 || 3.7 || .9 || .0 || 8.4 || 7.4
|- class="sortbottom"
| style="text-align:left;"| Career
| style="text-align:left;"|
| 169 || 109 || 23.9 || .453 || .289 || .668 || 2.8 || 3.3 || .9 || .2 || 9.3 || 9.8

Croatian national team
Planinić was part of the Croatian junior national teams that won the bronze medal at the 1999 FIBA Under-19 World Cup and the silver medal at the 2001 FIBA Under-21 World Cup.

Planinić was also a part of the senior men's Croatian national basketball teams at EuroBaskets 2003, 2005, 2007 and 2009.

References

External links

 NBA.com Profile
 Euroleague.net Profile
 NBA Stats @ Basketball-reference.com

1982 births
Living people
2010 FIBA World Championship players
ABA League players
Anadolu Efes S.K. players
Basketball players at the 2008 Summer Olympics
Basketball players from Mostar
BC Khimki players
Croatian expatriate basketball people in Russia
Croatian expatriate basketball people in Spain
Croatian expatriate basketball people in the United States
Croatian men's basketball players
Croats of Bosnia and Herzegovina
KK Cibona players
Liga ACB players
National Basketball Association players from Croatia
New Jersey Nets draft picks
New Jersey Nets players
Olympic basketball players of Croatia
PBC CSKA Moscow players
Point guards
Saski Baskonia players
Shooting guards
KK Dubrava players